Dr A.R.D. Prasad is an Indian Library and Information Science Academic, Information professional and Information scientist. Dr Prasad teaches at Documentation Research and Training Centre (DRTC), Bangalore as Professor of Library and Information Science and he is retired Head of DRTC, which is India's only proper ischool with a very strong research program. His areas of specialisation include Artificial intelligence-Applications in LIS, Natural language processing, Digital Libraries, Hypertext and Multimedia applications, Institutional repository, Open-source software used in Libraries, Open Access to Information, Semantic Web Technology, Free and open source software etc. His other area of interests are Mythology, Buddhism, Philosophy and Indian History. He is pioneer in the promotion and development of Open-source software used in Libraries and Information Centres in India, Open access (publishing) and Open Access movement. He is visiting Faculty of University of Trento, Italy.

Early life
He has Master of Arts (M.A), M.Phil. in Philosophy, BLIS, ADIS (from DRTC, ISI) and obtained his doctorate (PhD) on "Application of Natural Language Processing Tools and Technique in Developing Subject Indexing Languages" from Karnatak University, Dharwad.

Career
Dr. Prasad is senior faculty at Documentation Research and Training Centre (DRTC). He joined DRTC as a lecturer on 4 June 1990.

Memberships and association
 Member, Working Group, National Knowledge Commission, Government of India.
 Member, DSpace Governance Advisory Committee
 Member, Project Evaluation committee on E-Infrastructure, European Commission, Brussels.
 Member, UGC Curriculum Development Committee
 Member, UGC ETDs Guidelines (Electronic Theses and Dissertations)
 Member, Retro-conversion committee of National Library of India
 Consultant, United Nations-Food and Agriculture Organization (UN-FAO)
 A Fulbright Scholar(1999)
 Mentor, Google Summer of Code
 Invited Speaker, Indian National Science Congress, 2006, Hyderabad

Literary and scientific activities
Currently he is active in European Commissions FP7-FET project on Living Knowledge. He is Editor of the Proceedings of the International Conference on Semantic Web and Digital Libraries (ICSD-2007). He is also guest Editor of Online Information Review, V.32(4),2008, special edition on Semantic Web and Web Design.

Published Work

Peer reviewed articles in international Periodicals
 Devika P. Madalli and A.R.D. Prasad: Vyasa: a knowledge representation system for automatic management of analytico-synthetic system. accepted for the 7th International Conference of Society for Knowledge Organisation. 10–13 July Granada, Spain.
 Pijush Kanti Panigrahi and A.R.D. Prasad : An Inference Engine for Time Isolates of Colon Classification Schedule. 6th International Study Conference on Classification Research organised by FID/CR and University College London. June 16?18, 1997, London.
 Devika V. Aptagiri, Gopinath M.A. and A. R. D. Prasad. A knowledge Representation Paradigm for Automating POPSI. Knowledge Organization. V 22(3/4). 1995. pp. 162–167.
 A.R.D. Prasad. Prometheus: An Automatic Indexing System. 4th International Conference of the ISKO. 15–18 July 1996. Washington, DC.
 M.A.Gopinath and A.R.D.Prasad. A Knowledge Representation Model for Analytico-Synthetic Classification. In: Knowledge Organization and Quality Management, Edited by Hanne Albrechtsen and Susanne Oernager. Indeks Verlag, Frankfurt. 1994.
 Durga Shankar Rath and ARD Prasad. Heuristics for identification of Bibliographic Elements from Title Pages. Approved for publication in International Cataloguing and Bibliographic Control. To be published in December 2003.
 ARD Prasad and Durga Shankar Rath. Heuristics for identification of Bibliographic Elements from Verso of Title Pages. Sent for publication in Library Hitech.
 Ralf Depping: vascoda.de and the system of the German virtual subject libraries. In: Prasad, A.R.D. & Madalli, D.P. (eds.): International Conference on Semantic Web and Digital Libraries (ICSD 2007), 21–23 February 2007: 304–314. (pdf file, 730 KB )

Papers in Indian Periodicals

 A.R.D. Prasad. Z39.50 for Retrieving MARC21 Records in Batch mode. In Workshop on Information Resource Management, Documentation Research & Training Centre, ISI, Bangalore, 13–15 March 2002.
 A. R. D. Prasad. Metadata:Cataloguing of Web Resources Using Dublin Core and Marc21. In Digital Libraries:Content Creation, Access and Management. USEFI-IIT Delhi workshop. IIT, New Delhi. 18–22 December 2001.
 A. R. D. Prasad. A Brief Introduction of Z39.50. NACLIN- 2001. University of Hyderabad. 6–9 November 2001.
 A R D Prasad. Creation of Digital Libraries in Indian Languages Using Unicode. Paper presented at the Joint Workshop on Digital Libraries. USEFI, DRTC, and University of Mysore. Mysore. 12–16 March 2001.
 A.R.D. Prasad. Working with Digital Information using WWWISIS on Linux. In. CALIBER 2001. INFLIBNET and University of Pune, Pune, 15–16 March 2001. pp. 32–45.
 A R D Prasad. Using Multimedia Database with WWWISIS on Win9x/NT. Paper presented at the Workshop on Multimedia and Internet Technologies. Documentation Research Training Centre. Bangalore. 26–28 February 2001.
 A R D Prasad : Chaos! Thy Name is Internet. In: DRTC Workshop on Information Management including ISO 9000 QMS. DRTC, ISI Bangalore. 6–8 January 1999.
 A R D Prasad and Smitha Srishaila. File formats for Multimedia. Article published in the book Multimedia: its applications in Library and Information Science. T.R. Publications, Madras. 1998.
 Unit writer for the Postgraduate Diploma in Library Automation and Networking, Distance Education Programme. Editor. University of Hyderabad, Hyderabad. 1998.
 A R D Prasad and A Aruna. A Prototype LAN Model for Indian Universities. Paper presented at the National Seminar on Information Technology Applications in Libraries and Information Centers. Vidyasagar University. Medinipur. 24–25 March 1998
 A R D Prasad and A Aruna. Penelope's Web: New challenges to Librarians. 17th Annual Convention and Conference of the SIS on Virtual Libraries: Internet based Library and Information Services. University of Hyderabad, Hyderabad. 12–14 March 1998.
 A R D Prasad: Internet: Connectivity Issues. Paper presented in the DRTC Workshop on Practical Orientation to Internet. DRTC, Bangalore. 28–30 Jan 1998.
 A.R.D Prasad: Browsers: Interface to the Web. Paper presented in the DRTC Workshop on Practical Orientation to Internet.DRTC, Bangalore 28–30 Jan 1998.
 A.R.D Prasad: Customising Web browsing through Internet Channels. Paper presented in the DRTC Workshop on Practical Orientation to Internet. DRTC, Bangalore 28–30 Jan 1998.
 A.R.D Prasad: Interfacing the Web: An overview of alternatives. Paper presented in the DRTC Workshop on Practical Orientation to Internet. DRTC, Bangalore. 28–30 Jan 1998.
 Madhuchanda Bhattacharyya and A R D Prasad. Internet Webcasters. Paper presented in the 21st All India IASLIC Conference on Information Superhighway: its impact on Library and Information Services in India, Tamil Nadu Agricultural University, Coimbatore, 26–29 December 1997.
 A.R.D Prasad, Smitha Srishaila and P.H.Akkamahadevi: Natural Language Interface to Databases. Paper Accepted for the 16th Annual Convention and Conference of the Society for Information Science. 29–31 January 1997. Bhuvaneshwar.
 A.R.D Prasad and Prasenjit Kar: Self Sufficiency versus Resource Sharing: Implications in Library networks. Paper presented in the XVII National Seminar of IASLIC. 10–13 Dec 1996. Calcutta.
 A.R.D Prasad: Some reflections on the Impact of Information Technology on Library Science Profession. Paper presented in the DRTC workshop on Advances in Information Technology. Oct 28–30,1996. Bangalore.
 A.R.D Prasad and Devika V Aptagiri: Multimedia Technology: An overview of hardware aspects. Paper presented in the DRTC workshop on Advances in Information Technology. Oct 28–30,1996. Bangalore.
 Smitha Srishaila and A.R.D Prasad: An Overview of Multimedia File Formats. Paper presented in the DRTC workshop on Advances in Information Technology. Oct 28–30,1996. Bangalore.
 A.R.D. Prasad. IDA: A retrospective conversion software for OCLC, LC, BNB and Bookfind CD-ROM Databases. DESIDOC Bulletin of Information Technology, V 15(3). May 1995. pp 13–17.
 Devika V. Aptagiri, Sudhanshu Bala Satapathy and A.R.D. Prasad. Optical Character Recognition ib building bibliographic databases. In. XX IASLIC Conference. 26–29 Dec 1995. Lucknow.
 Devika V.Aptagiri and A.R.D.Prasad. Computer Assisted Thesaurus Construction. In: Research and Teaching in Classification and Indexing, Edited by M.A.Gopinath. DRTC Annual Seminar, 9–11 August, 94. Bangalore.
 A.R.D. Prasad and Ranjan Sinha Takur. Automatic Identification of Key Terms from Book Titles In: Research and Teaching in Classification.
 A.R.D. Prasad and C.R. Karisiddappa. Declarative programming and Thesaurus Construction. In: Database Production and Distribution, Edited by N.Seshagiri, I.K. Ravichandra Rao and N.V.Satyanarayana. Tata Mc Graw-Hill, New Delhi. 1993.
 A.R.D. Prasad and Bidyut Baran Kar. Parsing Boolean Expressions Using Definite Clause Grammar. Library Science with a slant to Documentation, v.31 (1), March, 94. pp. 24–26.
 A.R.D. Prasad. Introduction to Artificial Intelligence In: Artificial Intelligence and its Applications to Library and Information Work, Edited by A.R.D. Prasad. DRTC Refresher Seminar, 26–28 May, 93. Bangalore.
 A.R.D. Prasad. Logic and Logic Programming In: Artificial Intelligence and its Applications to Library and Information Work, Edited by A.R.D. Prasad, Drtc Refresher Seminar, 26–28 May 93, Bangalore.
 A.R.D. Prasad. Natural Language Processing In: Artificial Intelligence and its Applications to Library and Information Work, Edited by A.R.D. Prasad, DRTC Refresher Seminar, 26–28 May 93, Bangalore.
 A.R.D. Prasad. Towards a Common command Language. In: Energizing Library and Information Services, Edited by M.A. Gopinath. DRTC Refresher Seminar, 20—22 May 1992. Bangalore.
 A.R.D. Prasad. Natural Language Processing Techniques in Information retrieval: An Overview. In: Information Retrieval, Edited by I.K.Ravichandra Rao. Annual Seminar, 5–7 Feb, '92. Bangalore.
 A.R.D. Prasad. Guidelines for design and development for Computer Assisted Instruction (CAI) Software. In: 9th IATLIS Conference held at Visakhapatnam, 9–11 August 1992.
 A.R.D. Prasad. Optical Character Recognition. In: Current Research in Library and Information Science, Edited by S. Seetharama and C.R. Karisiddappa. RBSA Publishers, Jaipur, 1993.
 A.R.D. Prasad. Database Management Systems. In: Dimensions of Library and Information Science. Edited by V. Venkatappaiah, Concept Publishers, 1990.
 A.R.D. Prasad. A Case for Artificial Intelligence in Library and Information Science Curriculum. In: Specialization in Library and Information Science Education. 8th IATLIS Conference held at Bangalore, 17—19 January 1990.

References

External links
 http://www.grl2020.net/uploads/position_papers/A.R.D.%20Prasad.pdf 
 A.R.D. Prasad | Documentation Research and Training Centre
 http://www.ignca.nic.in/PDF_data/kn_digital001_pdf_data/T2a_Development_Digital_Repository.pdf 
 https://web.archive.org/web/20110721150059/http://ir.inflibnet.ac.in/dxml/bitstream/handle/1944/551/323-329(cal%2007).pdf?sequence=1 
 http://crl.du.ac.in/ical09/invitations.pdf 
 Wayback Machine

Karnatak University alumni
Living people
1954 births
Scientists from Bangalore
Indian statisticians
Natural language processing researchers
Data miners